Robert George Stewart (3 January 1962 – 20 August 2016) was a Scottish footballer who played as a forward.

Stewart was born in Airdrie. He began his senior career with Dunfermline Athletic in 1981 where he was best known for his goal for the then Second Division outfit against Rangers at Ibrox in the third round of the 1983-84 Scottish Cup which gave the Pars a shock lead before two late Rangers goals ended hopes of a major upset.

Stewart also played for Motherwell, Falkirk and Queen of the South.

Stewart died on 20 August 2016 at the age of 54.

References

1962 births
2016 deaths
Dunfermline Athletic F.C. players
Motherwell F.C. players
Falkirk F.C. players
Queen of the South F.C. players
Footballers from Airdrie, North Lanarkshire
Scottish Football League players
Scottish footballers
Association football forwards